Collection of Sacred Hymns may refer to various hymnals of the Latter Day Saint movement:

Collection of Sacred Hymns (Kirtland, Ohio), the first hymnal of the Latter Day Saint Church, published 1835 or 1836, 90 hymn texts
Collection of Sacred Hymns, informally known as the Manchester Hymnal, first published in Manchester, England, in 1840, 277 hymn texts
Collection of Sacred Hymns (Nauvoo, Illinois), by Emma Smith, published 1841, 304 hymn texts

Latter Day Saint hymnals